Listed below are English people of note and some notable individuals born in England.

Actors and actresses

Archaeologists and anthropologists

 George Adamson (1906–1989)
 Leslie Alcock (1925–2006)
 Mick Aston (1946–2013)
 Richard Atkinson (1920–1994)
 Edward Russell Ayrton (1882–1914)
 Churchill Babington (1821–1889)
 Philip Arthur Barker (1920–2001)
 Thomas Bateman (1821–1861)
 James Theodore Bent (1852–1897)
 Geoffrey Bibby (1917–2001)
 Howard Carter (1874–1939)
 Grahame Clark (1907–1995)
 David Clarke (1937–1976)
 Barry Cunliffe (born 1939)
 Glyn Daniel (1914–1986)
 John Disney (1779–1857), barrister and archaeologist
 E. E. Evans-Pritchard (1902–1973), social anthropologist
 Cyril Fox (1882–1967)
 Dorothy Garrod (1892–1968)
 William Greenwell (1820–1918)
 Phil Harding (born 1950)
 Kathleen Kenyon (1906–1978)
 John Leland (1502–1552), antiquary
 John Lubbock (1834–1913), banker, politician, naturalist and archaeologist
 John Robert Mortimer (1825–1911)
 Francis Pryor (born 1945)
 Colin Renfrew (born 1937), archaeologist
 Alice Roberts (born 1973), anatomist, osteoarchaeologist and anthropologist
 Andrew Sherratt (1946–2006)
 E.B. Tylor (1832–1917), anthropologist
 Mortimer Wheeler (1890–1976)

Architects

 Hubert Austin (1845–1915)
 Charles Barry (1795–1860) (Houses of Parliament)
 George Basevi (1794–1845)
 William Burges (1827–1881), architect and designer
 William Butterfield (1814–1900), leader in Gothic revival movement
 Rowland Carter (1875–1916)
 William Chambers (1723–1796) (Kew Gardens Pagoda and Somerset House)
 Thomas Edward Collcutt (1840–1924)
 James Cubitt (1836–1914)
 John Douglas (1830–1911)
 Sir Philip Dowson (1924–2014)
 Henry Flitcroft (1697–1769)
 Sir Norman Foster (born 1935)
 Philip Hardwick (1792–1870)
 Thomas Hardwick (1752–1829)
 James Harrison (1814–1866)
 Thomas Harrison (1744–1829)
 Nicholas Hawksmoor (1661–1736)
 Horace Jones (1819–1886) (Tower Bridge)
 Inigo Jones (1573–1652)
 Henry Keene (1726–1776)
 William Kent (c. 1685 – 1748), architect, landscape architect and furniture designer
 Edmund Kirby (1838–1920)
 Denys Lasdun (1914–2001)
 Thomas Lockwood (1830–1900)
 Edwin Lutyens (1869–1944)
 Hugh May (1621–1684)
 William Morris (1834–1896), architect and author
 John Nash (1752–1835) (Regent's Park, St. James's Park, Trafalgar Square)
 Henry Paley (1859–1946)
 Sir Joseph Paxton (1801–1865) (The Crystal Palace for The Great Exhibition, London)
 Thomas Mainwaring Penson (1818–1864)
 August Pugin (1812–1852) (Palace of Westminster)
 Anthony Salvin (1799–1881)
 George Gilbert Scott (1811–1878) (Albert Memorial, St Pancras Station)
 Giles Gilbert Scott (1880–1960) (Waterloo Bridge, also supervised rebuilding of House of Commons, London)
 Edmund Sharpe (1809–1877)
 John William Simpson (1858–1933)
 George Edmund Street (1824–1881)
 John Vanbrugh (1664–1726), Baroque architect (Blenheim Palace)
 Derek Walker (1929–2015)
 Alfred Waterhouse (1830–1905) (Natural History Museum, London)
 Aston Webb (1849–1930) (Buckingham Palace and Victoria and Albert Museum)
 Ernest Berry Webber (1896–1963)
 William Wilkins (1778–1839) (National Gallery, London)
 Sir Christopher Wren (1632–1723)
 James Wyatt (1746–1813)

Artists

 Sophie Gengembre Anderson (1823–1903), painter
 James Andrews (1801–1876), botanical artist
 Richard Ansdell (1815–1885), painter
 Banksy (born c. 1974), graffiti artist
 Walter Daniel Batley (1850–1936), painter
 Aubrey Beardsley (1872–1898), illustrator
 Suzzan Blac (born 1960), painter
 Sir Peter Blake (born 1932), pop artist
 William Blake (1757–1827), painter, poet
 Henry Charles Bryant (1835–1915), portrait and landscape artist
 Albin R. Burt (1783–1842), portrait painter
 Sir Anthony Caro (1924–2013), sculptor
 Anna Maria Charretie (1819–1875), miniature painter
 John Constable (1776–1837), landscape painter
 John Henry Dell (1830–1888), landscape artist and illustrator
 Tracey Emin (born 1963), conceptual artist
 Thomas Gainsborough (1727–1788), painter
 Andy Goldsworthy (born 1956), sculptor (land art)
 Antony Gormley OBE RA (born 1950), sculptor
 James Henry Govier (1910–1974), painter, etcher and engraver
 Steven Harris (born 1975), cartoonist
 Thomas Hazlehurst (c. 1740 – c. 1821), miniature painter
 Dame Barbara Hepworth DBE (1903–1975), sculptor
 Jamie Hewlett (born 1968), comic book artist and designer
 Nicholas Hilliard (1547–1619), miniature painter
 Damien Hirst (born 1965), sculptor/ conceptual artist
 David Hockney (born 1937), painter
 Sir Howard Hodgkin (1932–2017), painter
 William Hogarth (1697–1764), painter, engraver
 Master Hugo (fl. c. 1130–c. 1150), illuminated manuscript artist active in Bury St Edmunds
 William Holman Hunt (1827–1910)
 Sir Edwin Landseer (1802–1873), animal painter
 Celia Levetus (1874–1936), illustrator
 Richard Long (born 1945), land artist
 Sir John Everett Millais (1829–1896), painter
 Henry Moore (1898–1986), sculptor
 William Morris (1834–1896)
 Lawrence Mynott (born 1954), illustrator, designer and portrait painter
 Chris Ofili (born 1968), painter
 George Passmore (born 1942), artist (Gilbert & George)
 Sir Joshua Reynolds (1723–1792), portrait painter
 Bridget Riley (born 1931), painter
 Dante Gabriel Rossetti (1828–1882), painter
 Sir Stanley Spencer (1891–1959), painter
 George Stubbs (1724–1806), painter
 Joseph Mallord William Turner (1775–1851), landscape and marine artist
 Flora Twort (1893–1985), painter
 Mark Wallinger (born 1959), conceptual artist
 Rachel Whiteread (born 1963), sculptor
 Joseph Wright of Derby (1734–1797), Enlightenment painter

Broadcasters

 Michael Aspel (born 1933)
 Sir David Attenborough (born 1926), naturalist and broadcaster
 Richard Baker (1925–2018), broadcaster and newsreader
 Jeremy Clarkson (born 1960), TV presenter, broadcaster and writer
 Simon Cowell (born 1959), TV personality, record producer
 Johnny Kingdom (1939–2018), wildlife TV presenter
 Ray Mears (born 1964), author, TV presenter and survival expert
 Sir Patrick Moore (1923–2012), writer, TV presenter, astronomer
 Michael Parkinson (born 1935), presenter of British television chat show Parkinson
 John Peel (1939–2004), disc jockey, radio presenter, record producer and journalist
 Jonathan Ross (born 1960)
 Jimmy Savile (1926–2011), disc jockey, TV presenter, writer and media personality
 Mike Smith (1955–2014), TV and radio presenter
 Ed Stewart (1941–2016), radio and TV presenter

Businessmen and businesswomen

 Sir Frederic Bolton (1851–1920), shipping
 Sir Richard Branson (born 1950)
 Sir John Brunner (1842–1919), chemicals
 Frank Bustard (1886–1974), shipping
 Joseph Crosfield (1792–1844), soap and chemicals 
 Ron Dennis (born 1947), McLaren automotive
 William Gossage (1799–1877), soap
 Philip Green (born 1952), retail
 James Hanson, Baron Hanson (1922–2004), industrialist
 Thomas Hazlehurst (1779–1842), soap and alkali
 Robert Spear Hudson (1812–1884), soap powder
 John Hutchinson (1825–1865), alkali
 Peter Jones (born 1966)
 Sir Freddie Laker (1922–2006), pioneer of cheap air travel
 William Losh (1770–1861), alkali
 Alfred Mond (1868–1930), chemicals
 Henry Mond (1898–1949), chemicals
 Julian Mond (1925–1973), industrialist
 Stephan Morais (born 1973)
 William Morris, 1st Viscount Nuffield (1877–1963)
 Edmund Knowles Muspratt (1833–1923), industrialist
 Richard Muspratt (1822–1885), industrialist
 Charles Roe (1715–1781), silk industry
 Titus Salt (1803–1876), industrialist
 Harriet Samuel (1836–1908), jewellery
 Sir Ivan Stedeford (1897–1975), industrialist
 Sir Alan Sugar (born 1947), electronics
 Richard Tompkins (1918–1992), Green Shield trading stamps
 Jamie Waller (born 1979), entrepreneur
 Josiah Wedgwood (1730–1795), industrialist

Chefs

 Lisa Allen (born 1981)
 Frances Atkins
 April Bloomfield (born 1974)
 Heston Blumenthal (born 1966)
 Avis Crocombe (c. 1839 – 1927)
 Tamasin Day-Lewis (born 1953)
 Fuchsia Dunlop
 Keith Floyd (1943–2009)
 Rose Gray (1939–2010)
 Sophie Grigson (born 1959)
 Fiona Hamilton-Fairley (born 1963)
 Angela Hartnett (born 1968)
 Rosemary Hume (1907–1984)
 Robert Irvine (born 1965)
 Rachel Khoo (born 1980)
 Diana Kennedy (born 1923)
 Nigella Lawson (born 1960)
 Rosa Lewis (1867–1952)
 Elizabeth Marshall
 James Martin (born 1972)
 Allegra McEvedy (born 1970)
 Mary-Ellen McTague
 Jamie Oliver (born 1975)
 Merrilees Parker (born 1971)
 Jennifer Paterson (1928–1999)
 Marguerite Patten (1915–2015)
 Gordon Ramsay (born 1966)
 Rosemary Shrager (born 1951)
 Delia Smith (born 1941)
 Rick Stein (born 1947)
 Emily Watkins
 Marco Pierre White (born 1961)
 Anne Willan (born 1938)
 Sophie Wright
 Antony Worrall Thompson (born 1951)

Clergy

 Pope Adrian IV (c. 1100 – 1159), only English Pope
 Thomas Arundel (1353–1414), Archbishop of Canterbury
 Richard Bancroft (1544–1610), Archbishop of Canterbury
 Richard Barnes (1532–1587), bishop
 Archbishop Lawrence Booth, of York (1420–1480)
 Thomas Cobham (died 1327), Archbishop-elect of Canterbury, Bishop of Worcester
 William Charles Cotton (1813–1879), missionary and beekeeper
 Thomas Cranmer (1489–1556), Archbishop of Canterbury
 William Edington (died 1366), Bishop of Winchester
 William Howley (1766–1848), Archbishop of Canterbury
 Trevor Huddleston (1913–1998), anti-Apartheid activist
 Simon Islip (died 1366), Archbishop of Canterbury
 Simon Langham (1310–1376), Archbishop of Canterbury
 John Leland (1691–1766), Presbyterian minister
 Henry Mackenzie (1808–1878), Anglican Bishop of Nottingham
 Walter Maidstone (died 1317), Bishop of Worcester
 Simon Mepeham (died 1333), Archbishop of Canterbury
 John Henry Newman (1801–1890), Catholic cardinal
 Adam Orleton (died 1345), Bishop of Winchester
 Plegmund (died 923), Archbishop of Canterbury
 Walter Reynolds (died 1327), Bishop of Worcester, Archbishop of Canterbury
 William Smyth (c. 1460 – 1514), bishop
 Charles Spurgeon (1834–1892), Particular Baptist minister
 John de Stratford (c. 1275 – 1348), Archbishop of Canterbury, Bishop of Winchester
 Simon Sudbury (died 1381), Archbishop of Canterbury
 Joshua Toulmin (1740–1815), radical dissenting minister
 John Wesley (1703–1791), Methodist minister and evangelist
 Wilfrid (633-709/710), Bishop of York
 William Whittlesey (died 1374), Bishop of Rochester, Bishop of Worcester, Archbishop of Canterbury
 William Williams (1800–1878), Bishop of Waiapu
 Ñāṇamoli Bhikkhu (1905–1960), Theravada Buddhist monk and translator of Pali literature
 Ñāṇavīra Thera (1920–1965), Theravada Buddhist monk and known as the author of Notes on Dhamma
 Ajahn Amaro (born 1956), Abbot of Amaravati Buddhist Monastery
 Ajahn Khemadhammo (born 1944), founder and director of "Angulimala, the Buddhist Prison Chaplaincy"
 Ajahn Sucitto (born 1949), former abbot of Chithurst Buddhist Monastery

Comedians

 James Acaster (born 1985)
 Chris Addison (born 1972)
 Chesney Allen (1893–1982)
 Stephen K. Amos (born 1967)
 Rowan Atkinson (born 1955)
 Charlie Chaplin (1889–1977)
 Richard Ayoade (born 1977)
 Bill Bailey (born 1965)
 Ronnie Barker (1929–2005)
 Sacha Baron Cohen (born 1971)
 Julian Barratt (born 1968)
 Rob Beckett (born 1986)
 Matt Berry (born 1974)
 John Bird (born 1936)
 Jo Brand (born 1957)
 Russell Brand (born 1975)
 Charlie Brooker (born 1971)
 Roy 'Chubby' Brown (born 1945)
 Adam Buxton (born 1969)
 Alan Carr (born 1976)
 Jimmy Carr (born 1972)
 Jasper Carrott (born 1945)
 Graham Chapman (1941–1989)
 John Cleese (born 1939)
 Steve Coogan (born 1965)
 Peter Cook (1937–1995)
 Tommy Cooper (1921–1984)
 James Corden (born 1978)
 Barry Cryer (1935–2022)
 Jon Culshaw (born 1968)
 Jim Davidson (born 1953)
 Les Dawson (1931–1993)
 Angus Deayton (born 1956)
 Hugh Dennis (born 1962)
 Ken Dodd (1929–2018)
 Ade Edmondson (born 1957)
 Jo Enright (born 1968)
 Lee Evans (born 1964)
 Noel Fielding (born 1973)
 Bud Flanagan (1896–1968)
 Micky Flanagan (born 1962)
 John Fortune (1939–2013)
 Dawn French (born 1957)
 Stephen Fry (born 1958)
 Ed Gamble (born 1986)
 Ricky Gervais (born 1961)
 Dave Gorman (born 1971)
 Tony Hancock (1924–1968)
 Jeremy Hardy (1961–2019)
 Miranda Hart (born 1972)
 Lenny Henry (born 1958)
 Richard Herring (born 1967)
 Benny Hill (1924–1992)
 Matthew Holness (born 1975)
 Alex Horne (born 1978)
 Russell Howard (born 1980)
 Lee Hurst (born 1963)
 Eric Idle (born 1943)
 Robin Ince (born 1969)
 Eddie Izzard (born 1962)
 Jethro (1948–2021)
 Russell Kane (born 1980)
 Peter Kay (born 1973)
 Hugh Laurie (born 1959)
 Stewart Lee (born 1968)
 Alice Lowe (born 1977)
 Matt Lucas (born 1974)
 Joe Lycett (born 1988)
 Lee Mack (born 1968)
 Stephen Mangan (born 1968)
 Bernard Manning (1930–2007)
 Rik Mayall (1958–2014)
 Alistair McGowan (born 1964)
 Rory McGrath (born 1956)
 Paddy McGuinness (born 1973)
 Michael McIntyre (born 1976)
 Stephen Merchant (born 1974)
 Paul Merton (born 1957)
 Sarah Millican (born 1975)
 David Mitchell (born 1974)
 Bob Monkhouse (1928–2003)
 Eric Morecambe (1926–1984)
 Chris Morris (born 1962)
 Bob Mortimer (born 1959)
 Frank Muir (1920–1998)
 Al Murray (born 1968)
 Denis Norden (1922–2018)
 John Oliver (born 1977)
 Michael Palin (born 1943)
 Karl Pilkington (born 1972)
 Andy Parsons (born 1967)
 Sue Perkins (born 1969)
 Lucy Porter (born 1973)
 Jan Ravens (born 1958)
 Romesh Ranganathan (born 1978)
 Vic Reeves (born 1959)
 Mike Reid (1940–2007)
 Jennifer Saunders (born 1958)
 Peter Sellers (1925–1980)
 Frank Skinner (born 1957)
 Arthur Smith (born 1954)
 Freddie Starr (born 1944)
 Tracey Ullman (born 1959)
 Johnny Vegas (born 1970)
 Tim Vine (born 1967)
 David Walliams (born 1971)
 Holly Walsh (born 1980)
 Robert Webb (born 1972)
 Jack Whitehall (born 1988)
 Josh Widdicombe (born 1983)
 Norman Wisdom (1915–2010)
 Ernie Wise (1925–1999)

Criminals

 Myra Hindley (1942–2002), Moors murderer
 Ian Huntley (born 1974), Soham murderer
 The Kray twins (Ronald 1933–1995, Reginald 1933–2000), east London gangsters
 Jimmy Moody (1941–1993), armed robber, reputed contract killer and prison escapee
 Raymond Morris (1929–2014), murderer
 Harold Shipman (1946–2004), possibly the most prolific serial killer worldwide; convicted of 15 murders; probably killed over 250
 Peter Sutcliffe (1946–2020), the "Yorkshire Ripper"
 Fred West (1941–1995) and Rosemary West (born 1953), serial killers
 Steve Wright (born 1958), serial killer
 Graham Young (1947–1990), the "Teacup Poisoner"
 Michael McCrea (born 1958), former financial adviser and convicted killer who was jailed 24 years for the culpable homicide of a couple in Singapore.
 John Martin Scripps (1959–1996), spree killer who was executed for murdering a South African tourist in Singapore.

Economists

 R. G. D. Allen (1906–1983), economist, mathematician, and statistician
 Norman Angell (1872–1967), British internationalist and economist
 William Beveridge (1879–1963), economist and social reformer
 Edwin Cannan (1861–1935), economist and historian
 Colin Clark (1905–1989), British and Australian economist
 Ronald Coase (1910–2013), Nobel Prize–winning economist
 Martin Ellison, consultant to the Bank of England
 Friedrich Hayek (1899–1992), Nobel Prize–winning economist
 John Hicks (1904–1989), Nobel Prize–winning economist
 John Holland (1658–1722), founder of the Bank of Scotland in 1695
 William Stanley Jevons (1835–1882), economist and logician
 John Maynard Keynes (1883–1946), economist
 John Neville Keynes (1852–1949), economist, father of John Maynard Keynes
 Arthur Lewis (1915–1991), economist
 Thomas Malthus (1766–1834), demographer
 Alfred Marshall (1842–1924), economist
 Mary Paley Marshall (1850–1944), economist, wife of Alfred Marshall
 James Meade (1907–1995), Nobel Prize–winning economist
 John Stuart Mill (1806–1873), philosopher and economist
 Arthur Cecil Pigou (1877–1959), economist
 Lionel Robbins (1898–1984), economist
 Joan Violet Robinson (1903–1983), economist
 Richard Stone (1913–1991), Nobel Prize–winning economist
 Robert Torrens (1780–1864), army officer and economist
 Philip Wicksteed (1844–1927), economist

Engineers

 Sir Benjamin Baker (1840–1907), civil engineer, co-designer of the Forth Railway Bridge 
 William Baker (1817–1878), railway engineer
 Joseph Bazalgette (1819–1891), civil engineer, best known for creating the London Sewer System, hence making the city a healthier place to live
 James Beatty (1820–1856), railway engineer
 Sir Henry Bessemer (1813–1898), metallurgy engineer
 Ronald Eric Bishop (1903–1989), chief designer of the de Havilland Mosquito
 James Brindley (1716–1772), canal engineer
 Isambard Kingdom Brunel (1806–1859), transport engineer
 Sir Sydney Camm (1894–1966), aeronautical engineer
 Donald Campbell, railway engineer
 William Tierney Clark (1783–1852), civil engineer
 Sir Geoffrey de Havilland (1882–1965), aeronautical engineer
 Edmund Dummer (1651–1713), naval engineer
 Sir John Ambrose Fleming (1848–1945), electrical engineer 
 Tommy Flowers (1908–1998), designer and builder of the first electronic computer
 Sir John Fowler, 1st Baronet, civil engineer most famous as co-designer, alongside Benjamin Baker, of the Forth Railway Bridge
 Jesse Hartley (1780–1860), civil engineer
 J. B. Hartley (1814–1869), civil engineer
 Benjamin Hick (1790–1842), civil and mechanical engineer
 John Hick (1815–1894), civil and mechanical engineer
 Eric Laithwaite (1908–1998), engineer 
 Sir William Lyons (1901–1985), engineer, co-founder of the automobile manufacturer Jaguar
 William Mackenzie (1794–1851), civil engineer and contractor
 R.J. Mitchell (1895–1937), aeronautical engineer
 Robert Rawlinson (1810–1898), engineer
 Sir Henry Royce (1863–1933), engineer
 Nevil Shute (1899–1960), aeronautical engineer and author
 George Stephenson (1781–1848), railway engineer
 Charles Todd (1826–1910), meteorologist, in charge of constructing the Overland Telegraph across Australia
 Sir Barnes Wallis (1887–1978), engineer
 John Webster (1845–1914), engineer
 Sir Joseph Whitworth (1803–1887), engineer

Explorers

 Gertrude Bell (1868–1926), traveller in Iraq
 Thomas Cavendish (1560–1592), one of the Elizabethan Sea Dogs, privateer, navigator
 Capt. James Cook (1728–1779), sailor, explorer
 William Dampier (1651–1715)
 John Davis (1550–1605), Sea Dog, explorer and navigator
 Charles Montagu Doughty (1843–1926), explorer in the Middle East
 Sir Francis Drake (c. 1540 – 1596)
 Sir Ranulph Fiennes (born 1944), listed as the "greatest living explorer" by the Guinness Book of Records
 Martin Frobisher (1535–1594), navigator, one of the Elizabethan Sea Dogs
 Rob Gauntlett (1987–2009), youngest Briton to summit Everest
 Sir Robin Knox-Johnston (born 1939), first person to perform single handed non-stop circumnavigation of the globe
 Michael Palin (born 1943)
 Sir Walter Raleigh (c. 1552 – 1618)
 Robert Falcon Scott (1868–1912), Antarctic explorer
 Ed Stafford (born 1975), first person to walk the complete length of the Amazon River
 Freya Stark (1893–1993), Middle East explorer
 Wilfred Thesiger (1910–2003), explorer in East Africa and the Middle East
 Henry Timberlake (1570–1625), merchant and traveller
 Helen Sharman (born 1963), first British person in space and first woman to visit the Mir Space Station
 Major Tim Peake (born 1972), first British person in space under the European Space Agency and first British Person to visit the International Space Station

Filmmakers

 Richard Attenborough (1923–2014)
 John Boorman (born 1933)
 John and Roy Boulting (1913–1985 and 1913–2001)
 Alan Clarke (1935–1990)
 Charlie Chaplin (1889–1977)
 Mike Figgis (born 1948)
 Lewis Gilbert (1920–2018)
 David Hare (born 1947)
 Alfred Hitchcock (1899–1980)
 Peter Howitt (born 1957)
 Humphrey Jennings (1907–1950)
 Stan Laurel (1890–1965)
 David Lean (1908–1991)
 Mike Leigh (born 1943)
 Ken Loach (born 1936)
 Nick Love (born 1969)
 Anthony Minghella (1954–2008)
 Carol Morley (born 1966)
 Mike Newell (born 1942)
 Christopher Nolan (born 1970)
 Nick Park (born 1958)
 Michael Powell (1905–1990)
 Guy Ritchie (born 1968)
 Ken Russell (1927–2011)
 Ridley Scott (born 1937)
 Tony Scott (1944–2012)

Historians

 Frank Barlow (1911–2009)
 William Camden (1551–1623)
 Edward Gibbon (1737–1794)
 Richard Holmes (1946–2011), military historian and author 
 Sir Peter Leycester (1614–1678), historian and antiquarian
 George Ormerod (1785–1873), historian and antiquary
 Nicholas Rodger (born 1949), naval historian
 John Speed (1542–1629), historian and cartographer
 A.J.P. Taylor (1906–1990), popular historian

Inventors
See also List of English inventions and discoveries.

 Ruth Amos (born 1989), entrepreneur and inventor of StairSteady
 Richard Arkwright (1733–1792), revolutionised the cotton industry in England during the Industrial Revolution; once called the "father of the Industrial Revolution"
 Sir Timothy Berners-Lee (born 1955), inventor of the World Wide Web
 Henry Bessemer (1813–1898), inventor of the Bessemer Process which was the first way of mass-producing steel
 Hubert Cecil Booth (1871–1955), inventor of the vacuum cleaner
 Joseph Bramah (1748–1814), inventor of the hydraulic press (beer pump)
 Sir Henry Cavendish (1731–1810), discoverer of hydrogen
 Christopher Cockerell (1910–1999), inventor of the hovercraft
 William Congreve (1772–1828), rocketry pioneer
 Abraham Darby (c. 1678 – 1717), ironmaster
 James Dyson (born 1947), inventor
 James Hargreaves (1720–1778), weaver and inventor
 Sir John Harington (1561–1612), poet and inventor of the first water closet
 John Harrison (1693–1776), clockmaker
 Rowland Hill (1795–1879), inventor of the modern postal service
 Benjamin Huntsman (1704–1776), inventor of crucible steel
 Archibald Low (1888–1956), radio guidance
 Thomas Newcomen (1664–1729), inventor
 Sir Isaac Newton (1642–1727), founder of modern physics, inventor of the reflector telescope
 Sir Clive Sinclair (1940-2021), most commonly known for his work in the consumer electronics sector
 James Starley (1831–1881), bicycle pioneer
 George Stephenson (1781–1848), engineer
 Joseph Wilson Swan (1823–1914), inventor of the light bulb
 Charles Wheatstone (1802–1875), inventor
 Sir Frank Whittle (1907–1996), inventor of the jet engine
 Joseph Whitworth (1803–1887), inventor, known for standardising the screw thread

Journalists

 Mark Austin (born 1958)
 Reginald Bosanquet (1932–1984)
 Christopher Booker (1937–2019) 
 Michael Buerk (born 1946)
 Sir Alastair Burnet (1928–2012)
 Edward Chattaway (1873–1956), editor of The Star
 Jill Dando (1961–1999)
 Sir Robin Day (1923–2000)
 Katie Derham (born 1970)
 Peter Donaldson (born 1945)
 Julie Etchingham (born 1969)
 Anna Ford (born 1943)
 Paul Foot (1937–2004)
 Andrew Gardner (1932–1999)
 Krishnan Guru-Murthy (born 1970)
 Nina Hossain (born 1975)
 Richard Ingrams (born 1937) 
 Natasha Kaplinsky (born 1972)
 Lottie Moggach
 Mary Nightingale (born 1963)
 Jeremy Paxman (born 1950)
 Sophie Raworth (born 1968)
 Angela Rippon (born 1944)
 Willie Rushton (1937–1996) 
 Peter Sissons (born 1942)
 Jon Snow (born 1947)
 Alastair Stewart (born 1952)
 Moira Stuart (born 1949)

Military personnel 

 John Adams (1767–1829), last survivor of the Bounty Mutineers
 Harold Alexander, 1st Earl Alexander of Tunis (1891–1969), field marshal, Second World War commander
 Jeffrey Amherst, 1st Baron Amherst of Montreal (1717–1797), general
 George Anson, 1st Baron Anson (1697–1762), Admiral of the Fleet, noted naval reformer
 Sir Claude Auchinleck (1884–1981), Second World War commander
 Reginald Bacon (1863–1947), admiral, pioneer of submarines and torpedoes for the Royal Navy
 Robert Baden-Powell (1857–1941), soldier
 Sir Douglas Bader (1910–1982), fighter pilot
 Ralph Bagnold (1896–1990), founder of the Long Range Desert Group; explorer
 Sir Alexander John Ball (1759–1809), admiral, governor of Malta
 Samuel Barrington (1729–1800), rear admiral
 Lord Aubrey Beauclerk (1710–1741), Officer of the Royal Navy
 John Benbow (1653–1702), admiral  
 George Charles Bingham, 3rd Earl of Lucan (1800–1888), Commander of cavalry at the Battle of Balaclava
 William Riddell Birdwood, 1st Baron Birdwood (1865–1951), general, First World War
 Robert Blake (1599–1657), reforming Royal Navy Admiral
 William Bligh (1754–1817), best known for the mutiny of the Bounty
 James Henry Robinson Bond (1871–1943), corporal in the Royal Army Medical Corps
 Sir John Borlase Warren, 1st Baronet (1753–1822), admiral
 Philip Broke (1776–1841), rear admiral, known for his capture of USS Chesapeake
 Thomas Bruce (1738–1797), lieutenant general and politician
 James Thomas Brudenell, 7th Earl of Cardigan (1797–1888), Commander of the Light Brigade
 Richard Francis Burton (1821–1890), soldier, spy, linguist and explorer
 Freddie Spencer Chapman (1907–1971), known for his exploits in the jungle during the Second World War
 Leonard Cheshire VC (1917–1992), Royal Air Force pilot during Second World War and founder of the Cheshire Homes
 John Churchill, 1st Duke of Marlborough (1650–1722), soldier
 Sir Winston Churchill (1874–1965), British prime minister
 Charles Clerke (1741–1779), sailed with James Cook on all three of his expeditions, was the Captain of Discovery at the time of Cook's death he then took command until his own death at sea shortly after
 Sir George Cockburn, 10th Baronet (1772–1853), Admiral of the Fleet, admiral in charge at the capture and burning of Washington in 1814
 Edwin Cole (1895–1984), Squadron Leader
 Cuthbert Collingwood (1748–1810), vice admiral, Commander-in-chief of the Mediterranean Fleet 
 Henry Seymour Conway (1721–1795), general
 Charles Cornwallis, 1st Marquess Cornwallis (1738–1805), general
 Christopher Augustus Cox (1889–1959), private
 Oliver Cromwell (1599–1658), Lord Protector of England
 Christopher Augustus Cox (1889–1959), private
 Miles Dempsey (1896–1969), commander of the British Second Army During the D-Day landing
 Sir Francis Drake (1540–1596), sailor
 Sir John Duckworth (1748–1817), admiral, known for the Battle of San Domingo
 Thomas Farrington (1664–1712), lieutenant general
 Alexander Fraser (1824–1898), general
 Bruce Fraser (1888–1981), Admiral of the Fleet, commander of the British Pacific Fleet during the Second World War
 Prince Frederick, Duke of York (1763–1827), son of King George III, Commander-in-Chief of the Forces during French Revolutionary and Napoleonic Wars
 John French, 1st Earl of Ypres (1852–1925), general, World War I and Lord Lieutenant of Ireland
 Prince George, Duke of Cambridge (1819–1904), Commander-in-Chief of the Forces
 Charles George Gordon ("Chinese Gordon") (1833–1885), killed at Khartoum
 Hubert Gough (1870–1963), general
 Sir Thomas Hardy, 1st Baronet (1769–1859), vice-admiral, captained  at the Battle of Trafalgar
 Sir Arthur Travers Harris (1892–1984), Marshal of the Royal Air Force, airman
 Edward Hawke (1705–1781), Admiral of the Fleet, best known as the admiral at the Battle of Quiberon Bay
 John Hawkwood (1320–1394), famous medieval mercenary
 Samuel Hood, 1st Viscount Hood (1724–1816), mentor of Nelson
 Brian Horrocks (1895–1985), highly regarded general during World War II
 William Hoste (1780–1828), well-known frigate captain during the Napoleonic War
 William Hotham, 1st Baron Hotham (1736–1813), admiral
 John Howard (1912–1999), British Army major who led the coup de main party that captured the Caen canal and Orne river bridges.
 Richard Howe, 1st Earl Howe (1726–1799), admiral
 William Howe, 5th Viscount Howe (1729–1814), general in the American Revolutionary War
 John Jellicoe, 1st Earl Jellicoe (1859–1935), admiral during the First World War
 Louis Fleeming Jenkin (1895–1917), captain
 Roger Keyes, 1st Baron Keyes (1872–1945), admiral 
 Horatio Kitchener, 1st Earl Kitchener of Khartoum (1850–1916), field marshal
 Lofty Large, SAS soldier, author
 FitzRoy Henry Lee (1699–1750), Vice Admiral, Commodore Governor of the Colony of Newfoundland
 John Ligonier, 1st Earl Ligonier (1680–1770), general
 Trafford Leigh-Mallory (1892–1944), air commander of the Allied invasion of Normandy
 John Manners, Marquess of Granby (1721–1770), general
 William McMurdo (1819–1894), general
 Andy McNab (born 1959), former Special Air Service soldier and commander of the infamous Bravo Two Zero mission during the first Iraq Gulf War
 Samuel Mitchell (VC) (1841–1894), killed in action during the New Zealand Wars
 George Monck, 1st Duke of Albemarle (1608–1670), Civil War era general in Chief Command
 Simon de Montfort, 6th Earl of Leicester (c. 1208 – 1265), statesman and soldier
 Bernard Law Montgomery, 1st Viscount Montgomery of Alamein ("The Desert Rat") (1887–1976), field marshal and hero of World War II
 Louis Mountbatten, 1st Earl Mountbatten of Burma (1900–1979), statesman, sailor
 Horatio Nelson, 1st Viscount Nelson of the Nile (1758–1805), sailor, admiral
 Augustus Charles Newman (1904–1972) VC, The Essex Regiment, No.2 Commando, SAS, led the raid on St. Nazaire
 John Norreys (1547–1597), Tudor soldier
 Henry William Paget, 1st Marquess of Anglesey (1768–1854), general, hero of the Napoleonic Wars
 Sir William Parker (1781–1866), Admiral of the Fleet, was the admiral during the First Opium War
 Arthur Phillip (1738–1814), admiral, commanded the First Fleetinto what is now known as Port Jackson, First Governor of New South Wales
 Basil Charles Godfrey Place VC (1921–1994), along with Donald Cameron VC and crew crippled the pocket battleship Tirpitz during operation Source
 Dudley Pound (1877–1943), Admiral of the Fleet, First Sea Lord during the Second World War
 Henry Pulleine (1838–1879), lieutenant colonel
 Bertram Ramsay (1883–1945), admiral, commander of operation Neptune during Second World War
 Bernard Rawlings (1889–1962), admiral, second in command of the British Pacific Fleet during Second World War
 Frederick Roberts, 1st Earl Roberts of Kandahar (1832–1914), field marshal, last Commander-in-Chief of the Forces
 Sir William Robertson, 1st Baronet (1860–1933), "Wully" Robertson, distinguished soldier; the only man ever in the British Army to rise from the rank of private soldier to field marshal; the head of the Army for much of World War I; a highly influential figure as to strategy
 Frederick John Robinson, 1st Viscount Goderich (1782–1859)
 George Rooke (1650–1709), Admiral of the Fleet
 William Victor Trevor Rooper (1897–1917), captain
 Chris Ryan (born 1961), former Special Air Service soldier and member of the infamous Bravo Two Zero mission during the first Iraq Gulf War
 Siegfried Sassoon (1886–1967), war poet
 Charles Saunders (1715–1775), admiral, commanded the Fleet at the Battle of the Plains of Abraham
 Derek Anthony Seagrim (1903–1943), lieutenant colonel
 Sir James Simpson (1792–1868), general
 William Slim, 1st Viscount Slim (1897–1970), Commander in Burma during Second World War, Governor-General of Australia
 Sir Sidney Smith (1764–1840), Napoleon famously said of him "that man made me miss my destiny"
 Sir Horace Smith-Dorrien (1858–1930), general, World War I
 Fitzroy Somerset, 1st Baron Raglan (1788–1855), British commander in the Crimean War
 James Somerville (1882–1949), Admiral of the Fleet, Commander at Mers-El-Kabir
 Bill Speakman VC (born 1927), Black Watch, SAS Regiment
 Richard Strachan (1760–1828), known for his action after the Battle of Trafalgar
 James Brian Tait VC (1916–2007), nicknamed" Tirpitz", commander of 617 squadron
 Henry Tandey VC (1891–1977), most highly decorated private of the First World War
 Hugh Trenchard, 1st Viscount Trenchard (1873–1956), "father of the RAF" and first Chief of the Air Staff
 Frederic Thesiger, 2nd Baron Chelmsford (1827–1905), general
 Sir Thomas Troubridge, 1st Baronet (1758–1807), rear admiral
 Reginald Tyrwhitt (1870–1951), Admiral of the Fleet, commander of the Harwich Force during World War I
 George Vancouver (1757–1798), distinguished Royal Navy captain and explorer
 Edward Vernon (1684–1757), admiral
 Philip Vian (1894–1968), Admiral of the Fleet, distinguished destroyer captain also Commander in Charge of Air Operations, British Pacific Fleet during Second World War
 Archibald Percival Wavell, 1st Earl Wavell (1883–1950), World War II general, second to last Viceroy of India
 Sir William Welsh (1891–1962), air marshal
 Jane Whorwood (1612–1684), Royalist agent during the English Civil War
 Prince William Augustus, Duke of Cumberland (1721–1765), captain-general, victor of Culloden
 James Wolfe (1727–1759), general, hero of Quebec during the Seven Years' War
 John Woodhouse (1922–2008), reformed SAS selection and training techniques after World War Two

Monarchs

 Alfred the Great (c. 849–899) (reigned 880s–899), King of the Anglo-Saxons
 Queen Anne (reigned 1702–1714), also Queen of Scotland, then Queen of Great Britain after 1707
 Charles I (reigned 1625–1649), also King of Scotland, and Ireland
 Charles II (reigned 1660–1685), also King of Scotland
 Charles III
 Cnut (reigned 1016–1035)
 Saint Edward the Confessor (reigned 1042–1066)
 Edward I (reigned 1272–1307), English monarch
 Edward II (reigned 1307–1327), English monarch
 Edward III (reigned 1327–1377), English monarch
 Edward IV (reigned 1461–1470 and 1471–1483), English monarch
 Edward V (reigned 1483–1483), English monarch
 Edward VI (reigned 1547–1553), first English Protestant monarch
 Elizabeth I (reigned 1558–1603), Protestant queen and first Supreme Governor of the Church of England
 Elizabeth II 
 Harold Godwinson (reigned 6 January 1066 – 14 October 1066), died in Battle of Hastings
 Harold Harefoot (reigned 1035–1040)
 Harthacnut (reigned 1040–1042)
 Henry I (reigned 1100–1135)
 Henry III (reigned 1216–1272), English monarch
 Henry IV (reigned 1399–1413), English monarch
 Henry V (reigned 1413–1422)
 Henry VI (reigned 1422–1461), English monarch
 Henry VII (reigned 1485–1509) (Henry Tudor, the first Tudor monarch)
 Henry VIII (reigned 1509–1547), separated English Catholicism from link with the Roman Catholic Church
 James II (reigned 1685–1689)
 Lady Jane Grey (de facto 10 July 1553 – 19 July 1553) ("the nine days queen"), beheaded 1554, aged 16
 King John (reigned 1199–1216)
 Mary I (reigned 1553–1558), Roman Catholic queen
 Mary II (reigned 1689–1694), reigned jointly with her husband William III
 Richard of Cornwall (reigned 1257–1272), King of the Romans
 Richard the Lionheart (reigned 1189–1199), Richard I, English monarch, leader and hero of the Third Crusade
 Richard II (reigned 1377–1399)
 Richard III (reigned 1483–1485), last Plantagenet King, and last British monarch to die in Battle
 William I (reigned 1066–1087), "William the Conqueror", William of Normandy
 William II (reigned 1087–1100)
 William III (reigned 1689–1702), "William of Orange", born 1650 at The Hague in Holland, married an English princess, reigned jointly with his wife Mary II, until her death

Musicians

 Stuart Adamson, lead singer of Big Country 
 Adele, singer
 Thomas Adès (born 1971), composer
 Damon Albarn (born 1968), singer-songwriter
 John Alldis (1929–2010), chorus master and conductor
 Lily Allen (born 1985) 
 Marsha Ambrosius (born 1977), singer-songwriter
 Jon Anderson (born 1944), singer-songwriter, member of Yes
 David Arnold (born 1962), composer, musician and film scorer (notably four James Bond films)
 Malcolm Arnold (1921–2006), composer
 Quenton Ashlyn, society entertainer
 Rick Astley (born 1966), singer-songwriter
 Alexander Baillie (born 1956), cellist
 Bryan Balkwill (1922–2007), conductor
 John Barbirolli (1899–1970), conductor
 Gary Barlow (born 1971), singer-songwriter and member of Take That
 Syd Barrett (1946–2006), singer-songwriter, member of the early Pink Floyd
 Norman Beaker (born 1950), blues guitarist, singer-songwriter, producer
 Victoria Beckham (born 1974), singer-songwriter, dancer, fashion designer, author, businesswoman, actress and model
 David Bedford (born 1937), composer and musician
 Mark Bedford (born 1961), musician, songwriter and composer, bass guitarist for Madness
 Natasha Bedingfield (born 1981), singer
 Thomas Beecham (1879–1961), conductor
 Matthew Bellamy (born 1978), composer for Muse
 Lisa Beznosiuk (born 1956), flautist
 Acker Bilk (1929–2014), clarinettist and vocalist
 Alan Parsons (born 1948), composer and musician
 Roger Birnstingl, bassoonist
 Harrison Birtwistle (1934-2022), composer
 Colin Vearncombe aka Black (1962 – January 2016) best known for the song Wonderful Life.
 Cilla Black (1943–2015), British singer and television presenter
 James Blunt (born 1977)
 Ian Gillan (born 1945), singer for Deep Purple
 John Bonham (1948–1980), drummer for Led Zeppelin
 Ritchie Blackmore (born 1945)
 Tim Booth (born 1960), singer-songwriter and actor
 Adrian Boult (1889–1983), conductor
 James Bourne, member of the former rock group Busted, singer-songwriter
 David Bowie (1947–2016)
 Robin Gibb (1949–2012), singer-songwriter, member of Bee Gees
 William Boyce (1711–1779), composer
 Billy Bragg (born 1957)
 Havergal Brian (1876–1972), composer
 Sarah Brightman (born 1960), singer-songwriter, actress, and dancer
 Benjamin Britten (1913–1976), composer and pianist
 Justin Broadrick (born 1969), vocalist and guitarist, member of Godflesh and Jesu
 Ian Broudie (born 1958), singer-songwriter member of The Lightning Seeds
 Pete Burns (born 1959), singer-songwriter and lead vocalist with Dead or Alive
 Kate Bush (born 1958), singer-songwriter, musician and record producer
 Bilinda Butcher (born 1961), singer-songwriter, vocalist and guitarist of My Bloody Valentine
 William Byrd (1543–1623), composer
 Martyn Campbell (born 1970), bassist of The Lightning Seeds
 Les Chadwick (1943–2019), bassist of Gerry and the Pacemakers
 Justin Chancellor (born 1971), bassist, member of Tool
 Eric Clapton (born 1945)
 Adam Clayton (born 1960), bassist, member of U2
 Cheryl Cole (born 1983), singer
 Phil Collins (born 1951), singer-songwriter, musician, member of Genesis
 Imogen Cooper (born 1949), pianist
 Graham Coxon (born 1969), guitarist, singer-songwriter, former member of Blur and solo artist
 Ian Curtis (1956–1980), lead singer and composer for Joy Division
 Roger Daltrey (born 1944), singer, lead of The Who
 Peter Maxwell Davies (1934–2016), composer
 Andrew Davis (born 1944), conductor
 Colin Davis (born 1927), conductor
 Chris de Burgh (born 1948), singer-songwriter and multi-instrumentalist
 Gervase de Peyer (born 1926), clarinettist and conductor
 Norman Del Mar (1919–1994), conductor
 Frederick Delius (1862–1934), composer
 Dido (born Florian Cloud de Bounevialle Armstrong, 1971), singer-songwriter
 Pete Doherty, former co-lead singer of The Libertines; current lead singer of Babyshambles; solo artist
 Peter Donohoe (born 1953), pianist
 John Dowland (c. 1563 – c. 1626), composer of songs
 Nick Drake (1948–1974), singer-songwriter
 Jacqueline du Pré (1945–1987), cellist
 John Dunstaple (c. 1383 – 1453), composer
 Ian Dury (1942–2000), lyricist and vocalist for The Blockheads
 Edward Elgar (1857–1934), composer
 John Entwistle (1944–2002)
 George Ezra (born 1993), singer-songwriter
 Marianne Faithfull (born 1946)
 Gerald Finzi (1901–1956), composer
 Lita Ford (Born 1958)
 Chris Foreman (born 1956), musician, singer-songwriter and composer, guitarist for Madness
 George Formby (1906-1961), wartime entertainer, famous for his playing of the Banjolele and contribution to film
 Peter Gabriel (born 1950), singer-songwriter and former lead vocalist with Genesis
 Noel Gallagher (born 1967), singer-songwriter
 Orlando Gibbons (1583–1625), composer
 David Gilmour (born 1946), guitarist, singer and composer of Pink Floyd
 Ron Goodwin (1925–2003), composer and conductor
 Debbie Googe (born 1962), bassist of My Bloody Valentine
 Ellie Goulding (born 1986), singer-songwriter, musician
 Bella Hardy folk musician, singer-songwriter
 Dhani Harrison (born 1978), guitarist, son of George Harrison
 George Harrison (1943–2001), composer, member of The Beatles
 PJ Harvey (born 1969)
 Anthony Hewitt (born 1971), pianist
 Steve Hogarth (born 1959), songwriter, musician and lead singer of the band Marillion
 Gustav Holst (1874–1934), composer
 Dominic Howard (born 1977), member of Muse
 Tony Iommi (born 1948), guitarist for Black Sabbath 
 John Ireland (1879–1962), composer
 Robert Irving (1913–1991), conductor
 Jessie J (born 1988), singer-songwriter
 Mick Jagger (born 1943), rock singer and frontman of The Rolling Stones
 Sir Elton John (born 1947), pop star and composer
 Brian Johnson (born 1947), rock singer
 Brian Jones (1942–1969), founding member and guitarist of The Rolling Stones
 Davy Jones (1945–2012), singer/percussionist, member of The Monkees
 John Paul Jones (born 1946), bassist, mandolinist and keyboardist for Led Zeppelin
 Nigel Kennedy (born 1956), violinist
 Thea King (1925–2007), clarinettist
 Adrian Lambert (born 1976), bassist
 Jen Ledger (born 1989), drummer and backing vocalist for Skillet
 Albert Lee (born 1945), guitarist
 John Lennon (1940–1980), singer-songwriter, co-founder of The Beatles
 Leona Lewis (born 1985), singer-songwriter
 Cher Lloyd (born 1993), singer
 Andrew Lloyd Webber (born 1948), composer of musicals
 Julian Lloyd Webber (born 1951), cellist 
 Pixie Lott (born 1991), singer
 Chris Lowe (born 1959), keyboardist and composer, member of Pet Shop Boys
 Les Maguire (born 1941), pianist for Gerry and the Pacemakers
 Zayn Malik (born 1993), member of British-Irish boy band One Direction
 Gerry Marsden (1942–2021), leader of Gerry and the Pacemakers
 Chris Martin (born 1977), singer-songwriter, lead of Coldplay
 Sir Paul McCartney (born 1942), singer-songwriter, guitarist, co-founder of The Beatles
 Graham McPherson (born 1961), aka Suggs, lead vocalist of Madness
 George Michael (1963–2016)
 Tony Mills (1962–2019), singer and guitarist, member of Shy
 Keith Moon (1946–1978)
 Thomas Morley (c. 1557 – 1602), consort composer 
 Ella Mai (born 1994), singer-songwriter 
 Gareth Morris (1920–2007), flautist
 Morrissey (born 1959), composer, member of The Smiths
 Olivia Newton-John (born 1948), pop star
 John Ogdon (1937–1989), pianist
 Mike Oldfield (born 1953), composer and instrumentalist
 Ozzy Osbourne (born 1948), vocalist for Black Sabbath and Ozzy Osbourne
 Jimmy Page (born 1944), guitarist
 Hubert Parry (1848–1918), composer
 Liam Payne (born 1993), member of British-Irish boy band One Direction
 Bob and Alf Pearson (1907–1985 and 1910–2012 respectively), singers and pianist (Bob)
 Peter Pears (1910–1986), tenor
 Robert Plant (born 1948), singer, member of Led Zeppelin
 Anthony Pleeth (born 1948), cellist
 Stephen Preston, flautist
 Henry Purcell (1659–1695), composer
 Simon Rattle (born 1955), conductor
 Keith Richards (born 1943), guitarist and former member for the Rolling Stones 
 Paul Rodgers (born 1949), singer
 Martin Roscoe (born 1952), pianist
 Malcolm Sargent (1895–1967), conductor 
 21 Savage (born 1992), rapper, record producer 
 Chris Sharrock (born 1964), drummer for Noel Gallagher's High Flying Birds
 Ed Sheeran (born 1991), singer-songwriter
 Elsie Southgate (1880–1946), violinist
 Zak Starkey (born 1965), drummer, son of Ringo Starr
 Ringo Starr (born 1940), composer, drummer, member of The Beatles
 Crispin Steele-Perkins (born 1944), trumpeter
 Rod Stewart (born 1945)
 Joss Stone (born 1987)
 Joe Strummer (1952–2002), singer, member of The Clash
 Harry Styles (born 1994), member of British-Irish boy band One Direction
 Bernard Sumner, lead singer of New Order
 Connie Talbot (born 2000), child singer and reality star
 Thomas Tallis (c. 1505 – 1585), composer
 Benson Taylor (born 1983), composer
 Tinie Tempah (born 1988), rapper
 Neil Tennant (born 1954), vocalist, member of Pet Shop Boys
 Lionel Tertis (1876–1975), violist
 Frederick Thurston (1901–1953), clarinettist
 Lee Thompson (born 1957), multi-instrumentalist, songwriter and composer, founder and saxophonist of Madness
 Michael Tippett (1905–1998), composer
 Louis Tomlinson (born 1991), member of British-Irish boy band One Direction
 Pete Townshend (born 1945)
 Alex Turner, leader singer of the band Arctic Monkeys
 Sid Vicious (born John Simon Ritchie in 1957), bassist for Sex Pistols
 Rick Wakeman (born 1949), piano, keyboardist, musician
 Ricky Walters (born 1965), aka rapper Slick Rick
 William Walton (1902–1983), composer
 Roger Waters (born 1943), founder of Pink Floyd
 Charlie Watts (born 1941), drummer, The Rolling Stones
 Thomas Weelkes (c. 1575 – 1623), composer
 Florence Welch (born 1986), lead singer of Florence and The Machine
 John Wilbye (1574–1638), composer
 Cliff Williams (born 1949), bassist
 Ralph Vaughan Williams (1872–1958), composer
 Robbie Williams (born 1974)
 Steven Wilson (born 1967), musician, producer, composer and founder of Porcupine Tree
 Ron Wood (born 1947), guitarist for the Rolling Stones, former guitarist for The Faces
 Amy Winehouse (1983–2011), singer-songwriter
 Christopher Wolstenholme (born 1978), member of Muse
 Henry Wood (1869–1944), conductor
 Dan Woodgate (born 1960), musician, songwriter, composer and record producer, drummer for Madness
 Thom Yorke (born 1968), singer-songwriter, musician, member of Radiohead
 Marvin Young (born 1967), aka rapper Young MC
 Ralph Vaughan Williams (1872–1958), composer

Philosophers

 Donald Adamson (born 1939)
 G. E. M. Anscombe (1919–2001), philosopher
 Anselm of Canterbury (born 1033), philosopher, famous for creation of the Ontological Argument
 A. J. Ayer (1910–1989), philosopher
 Francis Bacon (1561–1626), philosopher and essayist
 Roger Bacon (1214–1294), medieval philosopher, alchemist, and theologian
 Jeremy Bentham (1748–1832), philosopher, founder of Utilitarianism
 R. M. Hare (1907–2002), philosopher
 H. L. A. Hart (1907–1992), legal philosopher
 Thomas Hobbes (1588–1679), philosopher
 William Godwin (1756–1836), political philosopher
 John Locke (1632–1704), philosopher
 John Stuart Mill (1806–1873), economist, political philosopher
 G. E. Moore (1873–1958), philosopher
 William of Ockham (c. 1285 – 1349), philosopher, theologian, created Ockham's Razor
 Thomas Paine (1737–1809), theorist
 Derek Parfit (born 1942), philosopher
 Bertrand Russell (1872–1970), philosopher
 Gilbert Ryle (1900–1976), philosopher
 Henry Sidgwick (1838–1900), philosopher
 Herbert Spencer (1820–1903)
 Peter Strawson (1919–2006), philosopher
 William Whewell (1794–1866), philosopher
 Alfred North Whitehead (1861–1947), mathematician
 Bernard Williams (1929–2003), philosopher

Photographers

 David Bailey (born 1938)
 Emma Barton (1872–1938)
 Cecil Beaton (1904–1980)
 George Beldam (1868–1937), first-class cricketer and a pioneer of action photography in sport
 John Blakemore (born 1936)
 Samuel Bourne (1834–1912)
 Larry Burrows (1926–1971), photojournalist
 George Davison (1854–1930)
 Terence Donovan (1936–1996)
 Brian Duffy (1933–2010)
 Frederick H. Evans (1853–1943)
 Roger Fenton (1819–1869)
 John French (1907–1966)
 Francis Frith (1822–1898)
 Peter Wickens Fry (1798–1860), early amateur photographer
 Bert Hardy (1913–1995)
 Alfred Horsley Hinton (1863–1908)
 Don McCullin (born 1935), photojournalist
 Eadweard Muybridge (1830–1904)
 Horace Nicholls (1867–1941)
 Tony Ray-Jones (1941–1972)
 Henry Peach Robinson (1830–1901)
 George Rodger (1908–1995), photojournalist
 Francis Meadow Sutcliffe (1853–1941)
 William Henry Fox Talbot (1800–1877), photographer, inventor of the calotype process

Politicians

 John FitzAlan, 1st Baron Arundel (1348–1379)
 Edmund FitzAlan, 9th Earl of Arundel (1285–1326)
 Richard FitzAlan, 10th Earl of Arundel (1306–1376)
 H. H. Asquith (1852–1928), British prime minister
 Clement Attlee (1883–1967), British prime minister
 Stanley Baldwin (1867–1947), British prime minister
 John Barrington, 1st Viscount Barrington (1678–1734)
 Charles George Beauclerk (1774–1845)
 Lord Sidney Beauclerk (1703–1744)
 Tony Benn (1925–2014), Labour politician
 Ernest Bevin (1881–1951), Labour politician
 Margaret Bondfield (1873–1953), Labour politician and first female Cabinet Minister
 Harold Briggs (1870–1945)
 John Bright (1811–1889), liberal politician
 Sir Paul Bryan (1913–2004)
 Dorothy Boyle, Countess of Burlington (1699–1758)
 George Canning (1770–1827), politician
 William Cartwright (1634–1676), politician
 Barbara Castle (1910–2002), politician
 Lord Henry Cavendish (1673–1700), nobleman and politician
 Sir Austen Chamberlain (1863–1937)
 Joseph Chamberlain (1836–1914)
 Neville Chamberlain (1869–1940), British prime minister
 James Chase (1650–1721)
 Lord Randolph Churchill (1849–1895)
 Winston Churchill (1874–1965), British prime minister
 Lionel of Antwerp, 1st Duke of Clarence (1338–1368)
 Kenneth Clarke (born 1940), Conservative politician
 William Cobbett (1763–1835), MP and reformer
 Sir Stafford Cripps (1889–1952), Labour politician
 George Nathaniel Curzon, 1st Marquess Curzon of Kedleston (1859–1925), Viceroy of India
 Archibald Dalzel (1740–1811), Governor of the Gold Coast
 Edward Henry Stanley, 15th Earl of Derby (1826–1893)
 Edward Smith-Stanley, 14th Earl of Derby (1799–1869)
 William Cavendish, 1st Duke of Devonshire (1640–1707), soldier, nobleman, and Whig politician
 Spencer Compton Cavendish, 8th Duke of Devonshire (1833–1908)
 William Cavendish, 4th Duke of Devonshire (c. 1720 – 1764)
 Benjamin Disraeli (1804–1881), British prime minister
 Alec Douglas-Home (1903–1995), British prime minister
 Anthony Eden (1897–1977), British prime minister
 Ferdinando Fairfax, 2nd Lord Fairfax of Cameron (1584–1648), nobleman and politician, also a commander in the Parliamentary army in the English Civil War
 Michael Foot (1913–2010), Labour leader
 William Bower Forwood (1840–1928), politician
 Sir Henry Bartle Frere (1815–1884), Colonial administrator
 Hugh Gaitskell (1906–1963), Labour politician
 William Ewart Gladstone (1809–1898), British prime minister
 Augustus Henry Fitzroy, 3rd Duke of Grafton (1735–1811)
 George Grenville (1712–1770), British prime minister
 William Wyndham Grenville, 1st Lord Grenville (1759–1834)
 Charles Grey, 2nd Earl Grey (1764–1845)
 William Hague (born 1961), Conservative politician
 William Savile, 2nd Marquess of Halifax (1665–1700)
 James Hamilton, Viscount Hamilton (1786–1814), nobleman and politician
 Denis Healey (1917–2015), Labour politician
 Edward Heath (1916–2005), British prime minister
 Henry Vassall-Fox, 3rd Baron Holland (1773–1840)
 Boris Johnson (born 1964), British prime minister
 William Kenrick (1831–1919)
 Edmund Holland, 4th Earl of Kent (1384–1408)
 John Wodehouse, 1st Earl of Kimberley (1826–1902)
 Brownlow William Knox (1806–1873)
 George Lansbury (1859–1940)
 Nigel Lawson (born 1932), Conservative politician
 Sir Francis Lee, 4th Baronet (1639–1667)
 John Leland (?–1808), English Member of Parliament for Stamford, 1796–1808
 Granville George Leveson-Gower, 2nd Earl Granville (1815–1891)
 John de Lacy, 2nd Earl of Lincoln (c. 1192 – 1240)
 Henry de Lacy, 3rd Earl of Lincoln (c. 1251 – 1311)
 Robert Banks Jenkinson, 2nd Earl of Liverpool (1770–1828)
 John Lubbock (1834–1913), banker, politician, naturalist and archaeologist
 Harold Macmillan (1894–1986), British prime minister
 John Major (born 1943), British prime minister
 Reginald Maudling (1917–1979), Conservative politician
 William Lamb, 2nd Viscount Melbourne (1779–1848)
 Herbert Morrison (1888–1965), Labour politician 
 Theresa May (born 1956), British Prime Minister
 Thomas Pelham-Holles, 1st Duke of Newcastle (1693–1768)
 Frederick North, Lord North (1732–1792)
 Philip Oliver (1884–1954)
 Henry John Temple, 3rd Viscount Palmerston (1784–1865), British prime minister
 Sir Robert Peel (1788–1850), British prime minister
 Henry Pelham (1694–1754)
 Gilbert de Clare, 1st Earl of Pembroke (c. 1100 – 1148)
 William Marshal, 1st Earl of Pembroke (1146/1147–1219)
 Richard de Clare, 2nd Earl of Pembroke (1130–1176)
 Spencer Perceval (1762–1812), British prime minister
 William Pitt (the Elder), 1st Earl of Chatham (1708–1778)
 William Pitt the Younger (1759–1806), British prime minister
 William Cavendish-Bentinck, 3rd Duke of Portland (1738–1809)
 Enoch Powell (1912–1998)
 Cecil Rhodes (1853–1902), imperialist
 Frederick John Robinson, 1st Earl of Ripon (1782–1859), politician
 William Robson, Baron Robson (1852–1918)
 Charles Watson-Wentworth, 2nd Marquess of Rockingham (1730–1782)
 Sir Thomas Royden, 1st Baronet (1831–1917), ship-owner and Conservative Party politician
 Thomas Royden, 1st Baron Royden (1871–1950), businessman and Conservative Party politician
 John Russell, 1st Earl Russell (1792–1878)
 Michael Hicks-Beach, 1st Earl St Aldwyn (1837–1916)
 Robert Arthur Talbot Gascoyne-Cecil, 3rd Marquess of Salisbury (1830–1903), British prime minister
 Henry Addington, 1st Viscount Sidmouth (1757–1844)
 John Simon, 1st Viscount Simon (1873–1954)
 Philip Snowden, 1st Viscount Snowden of Ickornshaw (1864–1937)
 Charles Beauclerk, 1st Duke of St Albans (1670–1726)
 John de Warenne, 6th Earl of Surrey (1231–1304)
 Thomas Townshend, 1st Viscount Sydney (1733–1800), Home Secretary in the Pitt government; suggested using what is now Australia as a penal colony for Britain
 Margaret Thatcher (1925–2013), British prime minister
 Sir Robert Walpole (1676–1745), British prime minister
 Sir Godfrey Webster, 4th Baronet (1747–1800)
 Sir Godfrey Webster, 5th Baronet (1789–1836)
 William Wilberforce (1759–1833), abolitionist
 William Willoughby, 5th Baron Willoughby de Eresby (c. 1370 – 1409)
 Robert Willoughby, 6th Baron Willoughby de Eresby (c. 1385 – 1452)
 Shirley Williams (1930–2021), SDP founder
 Henry Willink (1894–1973), politician
 Spencer Compton, 1st Earl of Wilmington (c. 1674 – 1743)
 Harold Wilson (1916–1995), British prime minister
 Edward Maria Wingfield (1550–1631), also soldier and English colonist in America

Revolutionaries

Robert Aske (c. 1500 – 1537), revolutionary leader of the Pilgrimage of Grace
Thomas Baker (d. 1381), leader of the Peasants' Revolt
John Ball (c. 1338 –1381), English priest and revolutionary leader of the Peasants' Revolt
Robert Catesby (1572–1605), lead planner of the Gunpowder Plot
Guy Fawkes (1570–1606), central participant in the Gunpowder Plot
Thomas Wyatt the Younger (1521–1554), leader of Wyatt's rebellion

Scientists

 Arthur Aikin (1773–1854), chemist and mineralogist
 Nathan Alcock (1707–1779), doctor
 Jim Al-Khalili (born 1962), theoretical physicist and broadcaster
 Charles Babbage (1791–1871), mathematician
 Joseph Banks (1743–1820), naturalist
 Isaac Barrow (1630–1677), mathematician
 Thomas Bayes (c. 1702 – 1761), mathematician
 Tim Berners-Lee (born 1955), computer scientist; inventor of the World Wide Web
 Patrick Maynard Stuart Blackett (1897–1974), physicist
 George Boole (1815–1864), mathematician
 Robert Boyle (1627–1691), natural philosopher
 Richard Bright (1630–1677), doctor, founder of Bright's Disease (a form of kidney disease)
 Henry Brunner (1838–1916), chemist
 Henry Cavendish (1731–1810), scientist
 Sir George Cayley (1773–1857), polymath and aviator
 Frank Close (born 1945), physicist
 Brian Cox (born 1968), physicist
 Francis Crick (1916–2004), molecular biologist
 John Dalton (1766–1844), chemist and physicist
 Charles Darwin (1809–1882), initiator of the theory of evolution
 Richard Dawkins (born 1941), evolutionary theorist
 Henry Deacon (1822–1876), chemist
 Paul Dirac (1902–1984), physicist
 Horace Donisthorpe (1870–1951), entomologist, myrmecologist and coleopterist
 Arthur Eddington (1882–1944), physicist
 Michael Faraday (1791–1867), scientist
 Ronald Fisher (1890–1962), geneticist and statistician
 Jeff Forshaw (born 1968), particle physicist
 Rosalind Franklin (1920–1958), chemist and x-ray crystallographer
 J. B. S. Haldane (1892–1964), geneticist
 James Hargreaves (1834–1915), chemist
 Stephen Hawking (1942–2018), cosmologist
 Oliver Heaviside (1850–1925), physicist
 John Herschel (1792–1871), mathematician and astronomer
 Peter Higgs (born 1929), physicist
 C. A. R. Hoare (born 1934), computer scientist
 Robert Hooke (1635–1703), scientist
 Edward Jenner (1749–1823), doctor
 R. V. Jones (1911–1997), physicist
 James Prescott Joule (1818–1889), physicist
 Joseph Lister (1827–1912), surgeon
 Bernard Lovell (1913–2012), astronomer
 James Lovelock (born 1919), scientist
 Martin Lowry (1874–1936), chemist
 John William Lubbock (1803–1865), banker, mathematician and astronomer
 Sir Charles Lyell (1797–1875), geologist
 John Maynard Smith (1920–2004), geneticist
 John McClellan (1810–1881), chemist
 Robert Mond (1867–1938), chemist
 Desmond Morris (born 1928), zoologist
 Roger Needham (1935–2003), computer scientist
 Sir Isaac Newton (1642–1727), founder of modern physics, last of the alchemists
 William Penney (1909–1991), mathematician, physicist, director of British nuclear weapon research
 Roger Penrose (born 1931), mathematical physicist
 Joseph Prestwich (1812–1896), geologist
 Joseph Priestley (1733–1804), chemist
 Martin Rees (born 1942), cosmologist and astrophysicist
 Frederick Sanger (1918–2013), double Nobel prize-winning molecular biologist
 Adam Sedgwick (1785–1873), geologist
 John Snow (1813–1858), epidemiologist
 Joseph Wilson Swan (1828–1914), physicist and chemist
 George Paget Thomson (1892–1975), physicist
 J. J. Thomson (1856–1940), physicist
 Henry Tizard (1885–1959), chemist and inventor
 Alan Turing (1912–1954), mathematician
 Alfred Russel Wallace (1823–1913), naturalist
 Alfred North Whitehead (1861–1947), mathematician
 Maurice Vincent Wilkes (1913–2010), computer scientist
 James H. Wilkinson (1919–1986), mathematician
 William Hyde Wollaston (1766–1828), chemist
 Thomas Young (1773–1829), scientist

Sportsmen and sportswomen

Terrorists
Sally-Anne Jones, ISIS terrorist

Writers

 William Shakespeare (1564–1616), playwright, actor and poet

Other notables

 Hannah Aldworth (died 1778), philanthropist
 Margery Arnold (fl. mid 14th century), landowner
 Rachel Ashwell (born 1959), author, designer and entrepreneur 
 Edward Betts (1815–1872), civil engineering contractor
 Thomas Brassey (1805–1870), civil engineering contractor
 Capability Brown (1715–1783), landscape gardener
 Donald Campbell (1921–1967), world land and water speed record holder
 Sir Malcolm Campbell (1885–1949), automobile and speedboat racer
 William Caxton (c. 1422 – c. 1491), printer
 Sir John Chesshyre (1662–1738), lawyer
 Grace Darling (1815–1842), heroine
 William Emes (c. 1729 – 1803), landscape gardener
 Elizabeth Fry (1780–1845), prison reformer
 Thomas Grissell (1801–1874), public works contractor
 Hilda Hewlett (1864–1943), pioneer aviator and aviation entrepreneur
 Ebenezer Howard (1850–1928), urban planner
 Daniel Howell (born 1991), YouTube personality and radio host
 Edward Kemp (1817–1891), garden designer
 Gideon Lester (born 1972), dramaturg, adaptator, theatre artistic director
 Philip Lester (born 1987), YouTube personality and radio host
 Peter Molyneux (born 1959), video game designer
 Sir Samuel Morton Peto (1809–1889), civil engineering contractor
 Joshua A. Norton (1811–1880), Emperor of the United States and Protector of Mexico
 Wat Tyler (died 1381), leader of the Peasants' Revolt (1381)
 William Wakefield (1801–1848), founder of Wellington, New Zealand
 Richard Walker (1918–1985), writer and pioneer of modern-day angling in Britain
 Sarah Elizabeth Wardroper (1814–1892), Matron of St Thomas's Hospital from 1854 to 1887
 Harriet Shaw Weaver (1876–1961), political activist and suffragist
 Joseph Williamson (1769–1840), philanthropist, merchant and tunneler
 Philip Yates (1913–1998), coal miner awarded the Edward Medal

English expatriates
The following were born English, but changed nationality later in their life.

 John Alden (c. 1599 – 1687), one of the leaders of the Pilgrims to North America
 George Alsop, (c. 1630s-c. 1670s), author
 Anthony Aston (died 1731), actor and dramatist
 Charlie Chaplin (1889–1977)
 Alistair Cooke (1908–2004)
 Cary Grant (1904–1986), film actor
 Avraham Harman (1915–1992), Israeli diplomat and president of the Hebrew University of Jerusalem
 Bob Hope (1903–2003)
 Stephen Hough (born 1961), concert pianist, became Australian citizen
 Thomas Paine (1737–1809)

See also
 List of people by nationality
 List of Cornish people
 List of Northern Irish people
 List of Scots
 List of Welsh people

References